Nikoloz Khatiashvili (born 22 May 1992) is a Georgian rugby union player. His position is prop, and he currently plays for the Houston SaberCats of Major League Rugby (MLR) and the Georgia national team.

References

Rugby union players from Georgia (country)
1992 births
Houston SaberCats players
Living people
Rugby union props
Sunwolves players
Yenisey-STM Krasnoyarsk players
Georgia international rugby union players
Stade Aurillacois Cantal Auvergne players
The Black Lion players